Dark Hollow is an unincorporated community in Lawrence County, Indiana, in the United States.

History
A post office was established at Dark Hollow in 1893, and remained in operation until it was discontinued in 1901. The community was named after the Dark Hollow Stone Company, which operated a quarry in a shady hollow.

References

Unincorporated communities in Lawrence County, Indiana
Unincorporated communities in Indiana